Diego Colón de Toledo y Pravia, 4th Admiral of the Indies (died 28 January 1578) was a paternal grandson of Diego Colón and his wife María de Toledo y Rojas, making him a great-grandson of Christopher Columbus.

He married his first cousin Felipa Colón de Toledo, 2nd Duchess of Veragua, the second daughter and heiress of Luis Colón de Toledo, 1st Duke of Veragua, and his first wife María de Mosquera y Pasamonte, without issue. He held the Almirante de las Índias office in her place, which she had inherited.

See also
Dukedom of Veragua
Pleitos colombinos

References

|-

Diego
Dukes of Spain
People of the Spanish colonial Americas
16th-century Spanish nobility
16th-century births
1578 deaths
Spanish people of Italian descent
Spanish West Indies
16th-century South American people